Besharam may refer to:
 Besharam (1978 film), a Hindi drama/thriller film
 Besharam (2013 film), an Indian action comedy film
 Besharam (TV series), a 2016 Pakistani drama serial